Liberal Movement may refer to:

 Liberal Movement (Australia), a political party in South Australia
 Liberal Movement (Lithuania), a political party in Lithuania